John Joseph Babka (March 16, 1884 – March 22, 1937) was an American lawyer and politician who served as a Democratic U.S. Representative from Ohio for one term from 1919 to 1921.

Early life and education
Babka was born to Czech immigrants in Cleveland, Ohio. He married Marie Kubu on January 8, 1908. Later that year, he graduated from the Cleveland Law School.

Career
Babka was admitted to the bar the same year and commenced practice in Cleveland. He served as special counsel to the attorney general of Ohio in 1911 and 1912, and as assistant prosecuting attorney of Cuyahoga County from 1912 to 1919.

Congress
Babka was elected as a Democrat to the Sixty-sixth Congress (March 4, 1919 – March 3, 1921).
He was an unsuccessful candidate for reelection in 1920 to the Sixty-seventh Congress.

He resumed the practice of law and served as delegate to the Democratic National Conventions in 1920 and 1932.

Death
At the time of his death, Babka was acting as liquidating attorney for the division of savings and loan associations of the department of commerce of Ohio.

Babka died in Cleveland on March 22, 1937, and was interred in Calvary Cemetery. He was a member of the B.P.O.E., Knights of Columbus, and Moose lodges.

Sources

1884 births
1937 deaths
Politicians from Cleveland
Lawyers from Cleveland
Cleveland–Marshall College of Law alumni
Burials in Calvary Cemetery (Cleveland)
Democratic Party members of the United States House of Representatives from Ohio
American people of Czech descent
20th-century American politicians
Catholics from Ohio